Pie, Pie Blackbird is a 1932 Vitaphone pre-Code short comedy film released by Warner Bros. on June 4, 1932, starring African American performers Nina Mae McKinney, the Nicholas Brothers (in their film debut, albeit uncredited), Eubie Blake, and Noble Sissle.

McKinney and the Nicholas Brothere were reunited in another Roy Mack musical short film written by A. Dorian Otvos, The Black Network (1936).

A clip from the film is included in That's Black Entertainment (1989) and the TV special It's Black Entertainment (2002). The full film is available on DVD for Hallelujah! (1929).

See also
Vitaphone Varieties

References

External links

1932 films
1932 comedy films
Warner Bros. films
American black-and-white films
American comedy short films
Films directed by Roy Mack
1930s American films